Lady Connie is a novel by Mary Augusta Ward, first published in 1916.

Further reading
 Boynton, H.W. (1916). "Some Stories of the Month," The Bookman, Vol. 44, No. 4, pp. 391–392.
 Hale, Edward E. (1916). "Recent Fiction," The Dial, Vol. 61, pp. 396–398.
 Knoepflmacher, U.C. (1960). "The Rival Ladies: Mrs. Ward's 'Lady Connie' and Lawrence's 'Lady Chatterley's Lover'," Victorian Studies, Vol. 4, No. 2, pp. 141–158.

Publication details
 1916 – London: Smith, Elder & Co. (first edition).
 1916 – New York: Hearst's International Library (first American edition).
 1916 – Toronto: McClelland, Goodchild & Stewart (illustrated by Albert Sterner).
 1919 – London: George Newnes.

External links
 Lady Connie, at Project Gutenberg
 Lady Connie, at Internet Archive
 Lady Connie, at Hathi Trust
 

1916 British novels
British philosophical novels
Novels by Mary Augusta Ward